The Philippines has produced 67 gold, 114 silver and 229 bronze medals in the Asian Games since 1951. The Asian Games is a multi-nation, multi sports event held every four years and is the most prestigious games in Asia next to the Olympics. This is a list of all Philippine Asian Games medalists, classified per sport. The next he Asian Games will be in China from 10 to 25 September 2022.

Philippine Asian Games Medalists 1951-2018

Archery

Archery made its début at the Asian Games in Bangkok, Thailand, in 1978, and has stayed on the program ever since. Compound archery competitions were added in 2014.
Year introduced: 1978
First medal : 2014
Last medal:  2014

Athletics

Athletics is one of the core sports of the Asian games. Athletics has produced 11 gold medals. Mona Sulaiman has the most gold medal with three.

Year introduced: 1951 
First medal : 1951 
Last medal: 1994

100 meters

200 meters

400 meters

800 meters

 Relay

 Relay

Discus Throw

High Jump

Hurdles

Javelin Throw

Long Jump

Pentathlon

Shot Put

Steeplechase

Basketball

Basketball has produced four gold medals and Carlos Loyzaga was a member of the team in all four victories.  The Basketball team won the gold medal from 1951 to 1962.

Year introduced: 1951
First medal : 1951
Last medal:  1998

Bowling

Tenpin bowling was first included since 1978 except in 1982 and 1990. Bong Coo has contributed five out of the seven gold medals for bowling.  She also holds the Philippine record for most gold medals won in the Asian Games.

Years played: 1978, 1986, 1994-2018
First medal : 1978
Last medal: 2010

Singles

Doubles

Masters

Teams

Trios

All-Events

Boxing

Since 1954, boxing has been part of the Asian Games and the Philippines has produced 15 gold medals, 8 of those came from Flyweight and Bantamweight Divisions who got 4 gold medals each and the only sport that has medaled since then. Featherweight and Middleweight Divisions are yet to get a gold medal. In 2010, a women's category was added and Annie Albania is the first ever recipient and the only women boxer to earn a medal up to this day.

Year introduced: 1954
First medal :  1954
Last medal: 2018

Light Flyweight

Flyweight

Bantamweight

Featherweight

Lightweight

Light Welterweight

Welterweight

Light Middleweight

Middleweight

Chess
Chess was included in the Asian Games schedule in both the 2006 edition in Doha and the 2010 event in Guangzhou. In 2022, it will be back in the AG.
Years played: 2006, 2010, 2022 		
First medal :2010  		
Last medal:  2010 		
		
Teams

Cue Sports
Cue sports were included in the Games for four consecutive editions from 1998 to 2010, after which they were removed. It will reappear in the Doha edition in 2030. The Philippines has produced a total four gold medals from 1998 to 2010.

Year played: 1998 to 2010, 2030
First medal : 1998
Last medal:  2010

Singles

Doubles

Cycling
Cycling debuted at the 1951 Asian Games and has been a part of the program ever since with the exception of 1954. The Asian Games feature four cycling disciplines: track (since 1951), road (since 1951), mountain bike (since 1998) and BMX (since 2010). In 1986, Cycling opened its door to Women's and first introduce in the Road Race event.

Year introduced: 1951
First medal : 1966
Last medal: 2018

BMX Event

Road Event

Track Event

Dancesport
DanceSport is a team sport. It becomes an official Asian Games sport in Guangzhou Asian Games, 2010.

Year introduced: 2010
First medal : 2010
Last medal:  2010

Latin

Diving
Diving is a part of the Asian Games since 1951.

Year introduced: 1951
First medal : 1966
Last medal:  1966

Equestrian
Since 1982, equestrian sports have been included in the Asian Games. Mikee Cojuangco-Jaworski produced the lone gold for Equestrian.

Year introduced: 1982
First medal : 1982
Last medal:  2002

Individual Jumping

Team Eventing

Team Jumping

Golf

The Philippines won four gold medals from 1986 to 2018. Yuka Saso led, with two gold medals in 2018.

Year introduced: 
First medal : 1986
Last medal:  2018

Individual Event

Team Event

Judo
Year introduced: 1986 
First medal : 2018
Last medal:  2018

Ju-jitsu
Year introduced: 2018
First medal : 2018
Last medal:  2018

Karate
Year introduced: 1994
First medal : 1994
Last medal: 2018

Kata Event

Kumite Event

Pencak silat 
Year introduced: 2018
First medal : 2018
Last medal:  2018

Tunggal Event

Tanding Event

Rowing
Year introduced: 1982
First medal : 2002
Last medal:  2002

Double Sculls

Roller Sports
Year introduced: 2010
First medal : 2018
Last medal:  2018

Skateboarding

Sailing
Year introduced: 1970
First medal : 1982
Last medal:  1982

Shooting

Shooting produced five gold medals.  The most successful athlete was Adolfo Feliciano in 1954 with two gold medals.

Year introduced: 1954
First medal : 1954 
Last medal:  2002

Air Rifle

Center Fire Pistol

Pistol

Rapid Fire Pistol

Rifle Prone

Rifle 3 Positions

Standard Rifle 3 Positions

Trap

Swimming

Swimming has produced ten gold medals from 1951 - 1988. Haydee Coloso-Espino has the most gold medals with three. She also holds the Philippine record for most medals won in the Asian Games.

Year introduced: 1951 
First medal : 1951
Last medal:  1998

3x100m Medley Relay

100m Backstroke

200m Backstroke

100m Breaststroke

200m Breaststroke

100m Freestyle

200m Freestyle

400m Freestyle

800m Freestyle

1500m Freestyle

 Freestyle Relay

 Medley Relay

 Freestyle Relay

100m Butterfly

200m Butterfly

200m Individual Medley

400m Individual Medley

Taekwondo
Year introduced: 1986 
First medal : 1986
Last medal:  2018

Bantamweight

Featherweight

Finweight

Flyweight

Heavyweight

Lightweight

Middleweight

Welterweight

Poomsae

Tennis
Tennis has contributed three gold medals from 1958 to 1961. Raymundo Deyro is the most successful player with two gold medals in 1958.

Year introduced: 1958
First medal : 1958
Last medal:  2006

Singles

Doubles

Mixed doubles

Team

Volleyball

Year introduced: 1958 
First medal : 1962
Last medal:  1962

Weightlifting
Weightlifting has one gold medal courtesy of Hidilyn Diaz in 2018.

Year introduced: 1951
First medal : 1951
Last medal:  2018

Bantamweight

Featherweight

Flyweight

Middle Heavyweight

Wrestling
Year introduced: 1954
First medal : 1954
Last medal:  1954

Featherweight

Flyweight

Middleweight

Wushu
Rene Catalan is the lone gold medal winner for Wushu.

Year introduced: 1990
First medal : 1994 
Last medal:  2018

Taolu

Sanda

External links 
 Olympic Council of Asia - Games

References

Asian Games medalists for the Philippines